Sepp Kusstatscher (born 17 March 1947 in Villanders) is an Italian politician and former Member of the European Parliament for North-East with the Federation of the Greens, part of the European Greens and sat on the European Parliament's Committee on Employment and Social Affairs. Furthermore, he is speaker of the Green Party of South Tyrol.

He was a substitute for the Committee on Transport and Tourism, a member of the Delegation to the EU-Former Yugoslav Republic of Macedonia Joint Parliamentary Committee and a substitute for the Delegation to the ACP-EU Joint Parliamentary Assembly.

Education
 1974: Master of Theology
 1977: Teaching certificate (vocational schools)
 1974–1979: Teacher at various schools
 1979–1986: Director of the Brixen vocational school for trade, commerce and industry 
 1986–2001: Hotel and catering section
 2001–2003: Training officer for vocational teachers in the province of South Tyrol

Political career
 1973–1974: Chairman of the South Tyrol Students' Union
 1974–1985: Mayor of Villanders
 1983–1988: Chairman of the Lower Eisack Valley Water Treatment Association
 1984–2004: Chairman of the Villanders Education Committee
 1988–1993: Member (SVP), Provincial Council of South Tyrol and Trentino-Alto Adige/Südtirol Regional Council, Chairman of the First Legislative Commission
 1989–1994: Chairman of the social affairs committees, South Tyrolean People's Party (SVP)
 2003–2004: Member Green Party of South Tyrol, Provincial Council of South Tyrol and Trentino-Alto Adige/Südtirol Regional Council
 2004–2009 Member of the European Parliament
 2009– Chairman of the Green Party of South Tyrol

See also
 2004 European Parliament election in Italy

External links
 
 
 

1947 births
Living people
Federation of the Greens MEPs
Politicians of South Tyrol
People from Villanders